Yo-kai Watch is a children's anime series based on the video game of the same name developed by Level-5. The anime was broadcast from January 8, 2014, to March 30, 2018, on TXN and related stations. An English dub, produced by Dentsu Entertainment USA, started airing on the Disney XD channel in the United States on October 5, 2015, after the series is officially canceled with never airing the new episodes, due to the low ratings. Canada's Teletoon and Disney XD Canada on October 10, 2015, and 9Go! in Australia on December 14, 2015. Episodes are split into multiple parts. In Indonesia, this anime also aired on Indosiar in 2016, and on RTV starting March 18, 2021.

An English version of the song was used for the dub, written by Mark Risley & David H. Steinberg, and performed by Peter Michail & Kathryn Lynn, but was replaced by "Yo-Kai Watch featuring Swampy Marsh" by Jeff "Swampy" Marsh & Dan Povenmire. The ending theme up through episode 24 (episode 35 in the English dub) is  performed by Dream5 (Melissa Hutchison and Alicyn Packard perform the English version). Beginning with episode 25 (episode 36 in the English dub), the ending theme changed to  performed by Dream5 and Bully-taichō (Hutchinson, Packard, & Brent Pendergrass for the English version). In episode 51, the ending theme changed to  performed by an AKB48 subgroup named NyaKB with Pandanoko. The opening theme changed again in episode 63 to King Cream Soda's .

Both the opening and ending themes were changed in episode 77, to mark the beginning of the "second season." In episode 102, the opening theme became  by King Cream Soda and the ending theme became  by Kotori with Stitchbird. In episode 130, the opening theme became "You Got a Otomodachi" by King Cream Soda and the ending theme became "Furusato Japon" (ふるさとジャポン) by the idol group LinQ.

To mark the start of the "third season," the opening theme became "Banzai! Aizenkai!" (ばんざい!愛全開!) by King Cream Soda (The English Version is "Cheers! Full of Love!" performed by Brown, Kendall Wooding, and Creber) and ending theme became "Torejā" (トレジャー, "Treasure") by LinQ (Creber for the English version). Starting with episode 179, the opening became "Gold...Nanchatte!" (ゴールド...なんちゃって!) by King Cream Soda, and the ending became "HaloChri Dance" (ハロ・クリダンス Haro・Kuri Dansu) by Youbekkusu Rengō-gun. With episode 202, the opening became "Time Machine wo Choudai" (タイムマシーンをちょうだい "Give Me a Time Machine") by King Cream Soda, and the ending became "Aa Jounetsu no Banbaraya" (ああ情熱のバンバラヤー) by LinQ.

In February 2018, it was announced that the anime would end on March 30, 2018, at 214 episodes and was replaced with Yo-kai Watch Shadowside to continue the storyline that began in Oni-ō no Fukkatsu.

In February 2019, it was announced that a revival of the series, now known as Yo-kai Watch! would air on April 5, 2019, replacing Yo-kai Watch Shadowside.

Series overview

List of episodes

Season 1 (2014–15)

Season 2 (2015–16)

Season 3 (2017–18)

DVD releases

References

External links
 
 
 

Yo-kai Watch episodes, List of
Episodes